"Chapter 19: The Convert" is the third episode of the third season of the American streaming television series The Mandalorian. It was written by Noah Kloor and showrunner Jon Favreau and directed by Lee Isaac Chung. It was released on Disney+ on March 15, 2023.

Plot 
After Djarin recovers, he and Bo-Katan depart Mandalore, though Bo-Katan withholds the Mythosaur's existence from him. Upon returning to Kalevala, they are attacked by Imperial TIE squads, who destroy Bo-Katan's home, and are forced to retreat to the secret Mandalorian enclave. Djarin presents the Armorer with a sample of the Living Waters as proof of his redemption, and because she has also bathed in the Waters, Bo-Katan is welcomed to the enclave as well. On Coruscant, Dr. Pershing receives a pardon by the New Republic but is startled to find Elia Kane among the amnesty program's recipients. Kane declares to assist Pershing in his efforts to continue his cloning research, which has been outlawed by the Republic. They sneak aboard a decommissioned Star Destroyer to steal the necessary materials, but Kane betrays Pershing to the Republic's lawkeepers and later secretly sabotages the mind-wiping procedure used on him.

Production

Development 
The episode was directed by Lee Isaac Chung, from a screenplay by Noah Kloor and series creator Jon Favreau.

Casting
The co-starring cast for this episode returned from previous episodes, including Omid Abtahi as Penn Pershing, Katy O'Brian as Elia Kane, Emily Swallow as The Armorer, and Tait Fletcher and Jon Favreau as Paz Vizsla. The Mandalorian is physically portrayed by stunt doubles Brendan Wayne and Lateef Crowder, with Wayne and Crowder receiving co-star credit for the third time in the episode. Pedro Pascal and Katee Sackhoff star as the Mandalorian and Bo-Katan Kryze, respectively.

Music 
Joseph Shirley composed the musical score for the episode, replacing Ludwig Göransson.

Reception 
On Rotten Tomatoes, the episode has a score of 79% based on reviews from 19 critics, with an average rating of 7.2/10. The website's critics consensus reads: "While The Mandalorian foray into moral ambiguity feels somewhat out of place, Omid Abtahi's sympathetic performance will win over many to "The Convert."

References

External links 
 
 

2023 American television episodes
The Mandalorian episodes